Manny Neves is a retired Portuguese-American soccer midfielder who played professionally in the North American Soccer League, United Soccer League, and Major Indoor Soccer League.

Born in the Azores Island of Pico, Neves’ family moved to San Diego, California at the age of 10.  He graduated from Point Loma High School. He attended San Diego Mesa College in 1979, playing on the school’s soccer team.  The California Surf of the North American Soccer League drafted Neves. In December 1979, Neves signed with the California Surf of the North American Soccer League.  The Surf folded at the end of the season and Neves moved to the San Diego Sockers where he played on the club’s reserve team, but broke his leg during a game in Mexico.  In 1984, Neves played for the Houston Dynamos in the United Soccer League.  The USL collapsed in 1985, and the Dynamos played an independent schedule that season.  In 1986, he played for the Los Angeles Heat of the Western Soccer Alliance. In 1987, he signed with the San Diego Sockers of the Major Indoor Soccer League.

References

External links
 Career stats

Living people
1960 births
American people of Azorean descent
American soccer players
California Surf players
Houston Dynamos players
Los Angeles Heat players
Major Indoor Soccer League (1978–1992) players
North American Soccer League (1968–1984) indoor players
North American Soccer League (1968–1984) players
Portuguese emigrants to the United States
San Diego Sockers (original MISL) players
San Diego Sockers (NASL) players
United Soccer League (1984–85) players
Western Soccer Alliance players
Association football midfielders

American people of Portuguese descent